The Verband Forschender Arzneimittelhersteller (vfa) or Association of Research-Based Pharmaceutical Companies, is the trade group of 43 pharmaceutical companies in Germany which are global players, representing more than two-thirds of the German pharmaceutical market, with nearly 80,000 employees in Germany.

In Germany more than 18,000 of their employees work in the field of research and development of pharmaceuticals. The vfa's focus has been on political consulting and public relations on the national and EU-level.

History
The Verband Forschender Arzneimittelhersteller, or Association of Research-Based Pharmaceutical Companies, was founded in 1994 with headquarters in Berlin as an Eingetragener Verein. It is the German or trade group for global players in the pharmaceutical industry.

Difference to the other three trade groups
Mid to small sized pharmaceutical companies in Germany are represented by the Bundesverband der Pharmazeutischen Industrie (BPI).

Another pharmaceutical industry association in Germany, the Bundesverband der Arzneimittelhersteller ("German Medicines Manufacturers' Association", BAH), has about 450 company members including traditional pharmaceutical manufacturers of OTC drugs and biotechnological products plus about 150 other members with a business interest in healthcare, such as publishers and polling organizations.

The third group is "Pro Generika", founded in 2004 in Berlin.  it represents 20 member companies and is the only trade association focusing on generic drugs, which cover 77% of the pharmaceutical needs of the Germany's statutory health insurance.
 
The former "Deutscher Generikaverband" in Berlin, founded in 1986, dissolved in 2012 due to dwindling membership.

Function
The vfa's focus has been on lobbying, political consulting and public relations on the national and international level.

The vfa claims, that with a manufacturer's share of 50 percent of the retail price, Germany ranks at the bottom in the European comparison.  the prescription drug price in Germany consisted of reimbursement to manufacturer (50%), wholesaler (4%), retailing pharmacies (14%) and taxes and discounts amounting to 32% of the end price, the highest such rate in Europe per vfa, EFPIA and Pharmaceutical associations of European countries.

For the first time in their 22-year history, vfa companies disclosed how much they paid physicians and other HCW's, medical organizations and medical facilities in June 2016. They sent their data to the "Freiwillige Selbstkontrolle Arzneimittel" (FSA), which publishes aggregate data together with other non-vfa companies who adhere to voluntary transparency. They planned to continue once a year, with data available for 3 years. In 2015, 71.000 physicians received 575 Million Euros, and only one third agreed to publication of their name.

Organization
The vfa publishes leading members in their "fotoarchive", with Birgit Fischer as managing director, but no other organizational details like employee figures or operating expenses.

 the vfa's latest statistics are in a 2015 downloadable publication, which contains mostly general PR.

Members
As of 2010, the vfa represented 43 German pharmaceutical companies and  biotech companies with about 80,000 employees, including the following eight largest global pharmaceutical companies with 2014 pharmaceutical sales in brackets: Novartis (51.3B$), Pfizer (44.9B$), Sanofi (40B$), Roche (37.6B$), Merck (36.6B$), Johnson&Johnson (36.4B$), AstraZeneca (33.3B$) and GlaxoSmithKline (31.5B$). Their 2014 sales have decreased due to corporate mergers and patent expiration, according to the vfa. In 2015, there were 265 pharmaceutical companies per The Federal Statistical Office.

The vfa members are:
Amgen	
 AbbVie Inc. Deutschland, 2013 spin-off of Abbott Laboratories 
 Actelion Pharmaceuticals Deutschland GmbH 
 Aegerion Pharmaceuticals GmbH
 Astellas Pharma GmbH
 AstraZeneca GmbH
 Baxter Deutschland GmbH
 Bayer AG
 Berlin Chemie AG
 bioCSL GmbH
 Biogen GmbH
 Bristol-Myers Squibb GmbH & Co. KGaA
 C.H. Boehringer Sohn / Ingelheim
 Daiichi Sankyo Deutschland GmbH
 Eisai (company) GmbH
 GlaxoSmithKline GmbH & Co. KG
 Grünenthal GmbH
 Ipsen GroupPharma GmbH
 Janssen-Cilag GmbH
 Lilly Pharma Holding GmbH
 Lundbeck GmbH
 MediGene AG
 Merck KGaA
 Merck & Co named MSD Sharp & Dohme on vfa website
 Mundipharma GmbH
 Novartis PHARMA GmbH Nürnberg
 Novo Nordisk Pharma GmbH
 Otsuka Pharma GmbH
 Pfizer Deutschland GmbH
 Roche Deutschland Holding GmbH
 Sanofi-Aventis Deutschland 
 Swedish Orphan Biovitrum GmbH
 Takeda Deutschland
 UCB (company) GmbH
 Vifor Deutschland GmbH
 ViiV Healthcare GmbH

Controversies
In 2010, the vfa and the BPI were listed as the most powerful lobby groups for the pharmaceutical sector in Germany.

See also
Association of the British Pharmaceutical Industry (UK)
Pharmaceutical Research and Manufacturers of America (US)

References

External links

Christina Elmer, Patrick Stotz and Stefan Wehrmeyer Euros für Ärzte Datenbank: Wie viel Geld hat mein Arzt bekommen? Interactive database, Der Spiegel, 14.07.2016 (German)

Lobbying in Germany
Pharmaceutical industry in Germany
Political advocacy groups in Europe
Pharmaceutical industry trade groups
Organizations established in 1994